S P Jain School of Global Management is a private business school with campuses in Sydney, Mumbai, Singapore and Dubai. The school offers undergraduate, postgraduate, doctoral, and professional technical courses in business.

History 
S P Jain School of Global Management was named after Sahu Shreyans Prasad Jain (1908-1992). He was an Indian businessman, parliamentarian, and a prominent member of the Jain community.

S P Jain established its first international campus in Dubai in 2004. Soon, in 2006, the Singapore campus was set up on invitation by the Singapore government. The third international campus was set up in Sydney, Australia, in 2012. And S P Jain launched its fourth, and latest, international campus in Mumbai, India, in 2015.

Administration 
S P Jain's Academic Board is chaired by Clifford Blake, Professor Emeritus and a member of the Order of Australia. He was the Foundation Vice-Chancellor of Charles Sturt University before taking up an interim Vice-Chancellor position at the University of Adelaide. The board has the Deans and Heads of the Dubai and Singapore campuses as members.

The school's administration includes an Examination Board for examination and assessment procedures, and an Industry Advisory Board with businesspeople from Dubai, Singapore, and Sydney. According to the business school's website, the Industry Advisory Board "makes curriculum suggestions, shares their knowledge through guest talks and recommends colleagues to conduct workshops".

Rankings 
S P Jain’s flagship Global MBA program has been ranked #4 by Times Higher Education - Wall Street Journal’s 1-year MBA rankings in 2018. In 2017, the program was ranked among the world’s top 20 by Forbes’ Best International 1-Year Full-time MBA rankings for the fifth year in a row. Before that, the program was ranked among the world’s top 100 by The Economist’s Full-time MBA rankings (2015) and by Financial Times’ Top Global MBA Rankings (2011 & 2012).

Additionally, the Executive MBA program at S P Jain Dubai was ranked among the top 100 in the world (#81) and top 10 in Asia Pacific (#7) by Ivy Exec EMBA rankings in 2019. Previously in 2018, the program was ranked 87th in the world and 8th within Asia-Pacific.

Programs offered 
The programs offered are:

BBA (Bachelor of Business Administration) 
In this four-year undergraduate program, students have an option to study the first year at S P Jain's Singapore or Mumbai campus, followed by a year at the Dubai campus and two years at the Sydney campus. Students of the program graduate with an Australian degree and 2-year Post Study Work Rights in Australia.

BBC (Bachelor of Business Communications) 
In this three-year undergraduate program, students study for the first year at S P Jain Global's Mumbai campus, followed by two years at the Sydney campus. Students of the program graduate with an Australian degree and 2-year Post Study Work Rights in Australia.

BDS (Bachelor of Data Science) 
In this three-year undergraduate program, students study for the first year at S P Jain Global's Mumbai campus, followed by two years at the Sydney campus. Students of the program graduate with an Australian degree and 2-year Post Study Work Rights in Australia.

BEC (Bachelor of Economics) 
SP Jain's Bachelor of Economics (BEC) is a 3-year full-time undergraduate program that gives students an in-depth understanding of economics in a global context. The program is quantitative in nature and made up primarily of subjects that will help you study international business environments and critically analyze issues from an economist’s perspective.

MGB (Master of Global Business) 
This is a 16-month full-time program, which includes a four-month internship. Students with 0–3 years of work experience are eligible to apply. Students spend 4 months each at S P Jain's campuses in Dubai, Singapore and Sydney, specializing in Finance, Marketing, Logistics, or E-Business.

GMBA (Global Master of Business Administration) 
A one-year full-time program, the GMBA is designed for executives with minimum 3 years of work experience. The curriculum is the same as a traditional two-year program but delivered in a compact time frame with fewer holidays. Students spend 4 months each at S P Jain's campuses in Dubai, Singapore and Sydney, specializing in Finance, Marketing, Information Technology, Logistics, or Consulting.

EMBA (Executive Master of Business Administration) 
An 18-month part-time program, the EMBA is designed for working professionals. It is offered in both an online learning and an on-campus format, conducted using the Engaged Learning Online Room or at S P Jain’s Dubai, Mumbai, Singapore and Sydney campuses. The program offers specializations in Finance, Marketing, Operations and General Management.

BDVA (Big Data & Visual Analytics) 
An 8-month full-time program, BDVA is conducted at S P Jain’s Mumbai Campus and offers courses in topics like Data Mining, Recommender Systems, Machine Learning, Data Visualization, Natural Language Processing and Cloud Computing. Students can specialize in Banking and Financial Analytics or Marketing Analytics.

Fintech 
A 9-month weekend program, Fintech is designed for working professionals. The program is offered to graduates with over 2 years of work experience and is conducted at S P Jain’s Mumbai campus.

GFMB (Global Family Managed Business) 
GFMB is a 12-month postgraduate program for the new generation entrepreneurs of family businesses. Students of the program study at S P Jain's campuses in Dubai, Mumbai and Singapore.

GOMP (Global Owner Managed Program) 
GOMP is a 12-month program for the owners of family businesses. The program is conducted over weekends at S P Jain’s Mumbai campus.

MGLUXM (Master in Global Luxury Goods & Services Management) 
MGLuxM is a 12-month full-time postgraduate program that is offered in collaboration with MIP Politecnico di Milano Graduate School of Business. Students of the program study at S P Jain’s new campus situated in Kurla in Mumbai and at MIP Politecnico di Milano’s campus in Milan. The course is divided into three terms, namely Term I (6 months in Mumbai);Term II (4 months in Milan), and Term III (Dissertation/ Internship)

DBA (Doctor of Business Administration) 
A 3-year online program, DBA is designed for executives and researchers. Classes are conducted on weekends via teleconference from S P Jain’s campuses in Dubai, Mumbai, and Sydney.

Executive Education 
S P Jain has set up Centers for Executive Education, Centers for Leadership, and Centers for Human Resources in Dubai and Singapore catering to senior executives. The short, modular courses are usually two days long and are customized to the needs and requirements of each client.

Campuses 

S P Jain has campuses in Dubai, Mumbai, Singapore and Sydney.

Dubai Campus 
S P Jain's Dubai campus is located in the Dubai International Academic City (DIAC), a city that was purpose-built for colleges and universities. The campus occupies an entire stand-alone building covering approximately 60,000 square feet, spread over three floors. It includes learning centers, mock trading rooms, a library, video conferencing facility, and a Reuters terminal.

Mumbai Campus 
S P Jain’s Mumbai campus is located in Kamala Mills in Lower Parel. A second campus was opened in Kurla in January 2016. The campus includes classrooms, libraries, mock trading rooms, video conferencing rooms, a simulations room and a Reuters terminal.

Singapore Campus 
On invitation of the government of Singapore in 2005, S P Jain set up its Singapore campus, which saw the first batch of MBA students in 2006 and BBA students in 2010. S P Jain has been accredited for its Global MBA program by ABEST21, The Alliance on Business Education and Scholarship for Tomorrow, Japan. S P Jain is the first business school in Singapore to receive this accreditation.

Sydney Campus 
The Sydney campus is the third international campus of S P Jain School of Global Management after Dubai and Singapore. Located at the Sydney Olympic Park, the campus has a built up area of 72,000 square feet (6,700 m2) and is large enough to accommodate 500 full-time students.

References

External links 

 
Business schools in Mumbai
Business schools in Singapore
Business schools in the United Arab Emirates
Business schools in Australia
Jain universities and colleges
Educational institutions established in 2004
2004 establishments in the United Arab Emirates